Alexander Solomonovich Izgoev (1872–1935) was a Russian journalist and political activist in the Kadet Party.

He was born Alexander Solomonovich Lande in Irbit in the Urals and attended Novorossiysk and Tomsk University. He became a journalist writing for the Kadet newspaper Rech''' (Speech) and Pyotr Struve's Russkaya mysl''. He joined the central committee of the Kadet Party in 1906.

References

1872 births
1935 deaths
19th-century journalists from the Russian Empire
20th-century Russian journalists
Russian male journalists
People from Irbit
Tomsk State University alumni